Rachel van Cutsen (born 8 July 1984) is a right-handed Dutch badminton player. A native of Spijkenisse, she can play either in singles or in doubles matches. She was part of the Dutch national women's team that won silver at the 2006 Uber Cup.

Achievements

BWF International Challenge/Series/European Circuit 
Women's singles

Women's doubles

  BWF International Challenge tournament
  BWF International Series/ European Circuit tournament

References

External links 
 

1984 births
Living people
People from Spijkenisse
Dutch female badminton players
Sportspeople from South Holland